Minuscule 852 (in the Gregory-Aland numbering), ε406 (von Soden), is a 14th-century Greek minuscule manuscript of the New Testament on parchment. The manuscript has not survived in complete condition.

Description 

The codex contains the text of the four Gospels on 165 parchment leaves (size ). The text is written in one column per page, 28 lines per page, with some lacunae in Matthew 28:18-20; Mark 1:1-21; Luke 1:1-22; John 1:1-27.

The text is divided according to chapters, whose numbers are given at the margin, and their titles at the top of the pages. There is also another division according to the smaller Ammonian Sections (in Mark 236 Sections, the last in 16:12), without references to the Eusebian Canons.

It also contains the Synaxarion and Menologion.

Text 
The Greek text of the codex is representative of the Byzantine text-type. Hermann von Soden included it in the textual family Kx. Kurt Aland placed the Greek text of the codex in Category V.

According to the Claremont Profile Method it represents the textual family Kx in Luke 1 and Luke 10. In Luke 20 the manuscript is defective, in Luke 1 the manuscript is fragmentary.

It lacks the text of Matthew 16:2b–3 (Signs of the times).

History 

C. R. Gregory dated the manuscript to the year ca. 1300. Currently the manuscript is dated by the INTF to the year ca. 1300. The name of scribe was Andreas, who copied it at the wish of one John.

The manuscript was added to the list of New Testament manuscripts by Scrivener (732e) and Gregory (852e). C. R. Gregory saw it in 1886.

The manuscript once belonged to Borgianus. Currently it is housed in the Vatican Library (Borg. gr. 9), in Rome.

See also 

 List of New Testament minuscules
 Biblical manuscript
 Textual criticism

References

Further reading 

 
 A. Turyn, Codices Graeci Vaticani saeculis XIII et XIV scripti, Codices e Vaticanis selecti 28 (Vatican, 1964), 73, 100f.

External links 
 

Greek New Testament minuscules
14th-century biblical manuscripts
Manuscripts of the Vatican Library